In its early years, the British V bomber force relied on the concept of aircraft dispersal to escape the effects of an enemy attack on their main bases. There were 22 such bases in 1962, in addition to the ten main bases a total of 32 bases available for the V bomber force.

In times of heightened international tension the V bomber force, already loaded with their nuclear weapons, could be flown to the dispersal bases where they could be kept at a few minutes readiness to take-off. The bases were situated around the United Kingdom in such a way that a nuclear strike by an attacking state could not be guaranteed to knock out all of Britain's ability to retaliate. However, except during exercises, the dispersal bases, capable of taking two to four aircraft each, were never used. During the Cuban Missile Crisis of 1962, Prime Minister Harold Macmillan declined to order the dispersal of the V-Force because he believed the Soviets would view this as provocative. The bombers were instead held at 15-minute readiness at their main bases.

The dispersal bases are mentioned in the opening titles of the 1965 Peter Watkins documentary The War Game.

Types 

Dispersal types include:

 Operational Readiness Platform (ORP): Usually of a group of 4 aircraft pans attached to the runway where aircraft can taxi in and out without the use of a tug
 Dispersal Airfield: Group of 4 aircraft pans where aircraft can taxi in and out without the use of a tug, usually with additional support buildings
 Home Station "H": Group of 4 aircraft pans in the shape of the letter "H" where aircraft cannot taxi in and out without the use of a tug
 Home Station Looped "H": Group of 4 aircraft pans in the shape of the letter "H" where aircraft can taxi in and out without the use of a tug, usually with additional support buildings

Main bases

Dispersal bases

Scotland

Northern Ireland

England

Wales

See also
 List of UK Thor missile bases
 List of Royal Air Force stations
 Four-minute warning

References

Citations

Bibliography

 Wynn, Humphrey - RAF Strategic Nuclear Deterrent Forces, their Origins, Roles and Deployment 1946-69  - HMSO London - 1994 -  - p. 449

Royal Air Force stations
Royal Air Force lists